The 1959 Society of Film and Television Arts Television Awards were the first giving under that name of the United Kingdom's premier television awards, having previously been known as the Guild of Television Producers and Directors Awards before that organisation's merger with the British Film Academy. The awards later became known as the British Academy Television Awards, under which name they are still given.

Winners
Actor
Donald Pleasence
Actress
Gwen Watford
Designer
Stephen Bundy
Drama Production
Silvio Narizzano
Factual
The production team of Tonight (BBC)
Additional
The production team of Monitor (BBC)
Light Entertainment (Production)
Joan Kemp-Welch
Light Entertainment (Artist)
Alan Melville
Personality
Cliff Michelmore
Scriptwriter
Colin Morris
Special Award
The production team of Monitor (TV series)
Writers Award
Colin Morris and Ken Hughes

References
Archive of winners on official BAFTA website (retrieved February 19, 2006).

British Academy Film Awards
Society of Film and Television Arts Television Awards
Society of Film and Television Arts Television Awards
Society of Film and Television Arts Television Awards